Tirinyi is a town in the Kibuku District in the Eastern Region of Uganda.

Location
The coordinates of the town are 1°00'04.0"N, 33°45'45.0"E (Latitude:1.001123; Longitude:33.762486).

Overview
Tirinyi is the southernmost location on the Tirinyi–Pallisa–Kamonkoli–Kumi Road.

See also
List of cities and towns in Uganda

References

Populated places in Eastern Region, Uganda
Kibuku District